The J.C. Richardson House is a historic house at 67 Gillison Branch Road in Robertville, South Carolina.  It is a two-story wood-frame house, built c. 1880.  It is an excellent local example of Folk Victorian style, with Chinese Chippendale details on the balustrades of its two-story porch, and Queen Anne elements including cutaway bay windows.

The house was listed on the National Register of Historic Places in 2014.

See also
National Register of Historic Places listings in Jasper County, South Carolina

References

Houses on the National Register of Historic Places in South Carolina
Houses in Jasper County, South Carolina
National Register of Historic Places in Jasper County, South Carolina